The Global Privacy Enforcement Network (GPEN) is a group of privacy regulators whose mission is to improve cooperation in enforcement of cross-border laws affecting privacy.

Overview

The Global Privacy Enforcement Network was formed in 2010 in response to an OECD Recommendation on Cross-border Cooperation in the Enforcement of Laws Protecting Privacy.  That document recommended cooperation among privacy authorities in areas such as education and enforcement.

Members include privacy authorities from Australia, Belgium, Bulgaria, Canada, Colombia, Macau SAR (China), Czech Republic, Estonia, France, Germany, Guernsey, Ireland, Israel, Italy, Korea, Mexico, Netherlands, New Zealand, Norway, Poland, Slovenia, Spain, Switzerland, Ukraine, United Kingdom, the United States, and the European Union.

Activities
In March 2013, GPEN announced that, with the cooperation of other local privacy authorities, it would conduct a survey of smartphone applications to determine how their developers were addressing user privacy in order to assess legal compliance and educate the public.

References

External links
 Official website

Privacy organizations